Brain terrain, also called knobs-brain coral and brain coral terrain, is a feature of the Martian surface, consisting of complex ridges found on lobate debris aprons, lineated valley fill and concentric crater fill. It is so named because it suggests the ridges on the surface of the human brain. Wide ridges are called closed-cell brain terrain, and the less common narrow ridges are called open-cell brain terrain. It is thought that the wide closed-cell terrain contains a core of ice, and when the ice disappears the center of the wide ridge collapses to produce the narrow ridges of the open-cell brain terrain. Shadow measurements from HiRISE indicate the ridges are 4-5 meters high. Brain terrain has been observed to form from what has been called an "Upper Plains Unit." The process begins with the formation of stress cracks. The upper plains unit fell from the sky as snow and as ice coated dust.

Today it is widely accepted that glacier-like forms, lobate debris aprons, lineated valley fill, and concentric fill are all related in that they have the same surface texture. Glacier-like forms in valleys and cirque-like alcoves may coalesce with others to produce lobate debris aprons. When opposing lobate debris aprons converge, linear valley fill results. They probably all contain ice-rich material.

Many of these features are found in the Northern hemisphere in parts of a boundary called the Martian dichotomy, mostly between 0 and 70 E longitudes. Near this area are regions that are named from ancient places: Deuteronilus Mensae, Protonilus Mensae, and Nilosyrtis Mensae.

Lobate debris aprons, lineated valley fill, and concentric fill probably have dirt and rock debris covering huge deposits of ice.

See also

References 

Surface features of Mars